Westwood Plateau is a neighbourhood in the northern region of Coquitlam, British Columbia.

It is named for Westwood Motorsport Park which existed on the plateau before the community was built, and was closed in 1990 to make way for real estate development. Hampton Park Elementary School was built on top of the actual raceway.

History 
The area currently known as Westwood Plateau was crown land purchased by Wesbild Corp. in 1989, and between then and 2005 transformed the area into a residential community of 4525 homes and in 2010 is home to about 15,000 residents.

Geography
Westwood Plateau is bounded by the city boundary with Port Moody to the west, David Avenue to the south, and Pipeline Road to the east. Although touted as a plateau, the area is actually sloped rising from between 60 and 100 metres above sea level to almost 400 metres. Some roadways are quite steep, but mostly gently curving roads climb to the top where a golf course is located.

Urban planning 
The area features extensive greenbelts that protect existing creeks. Townhomes, duplexes, and condominium style homes contribute another 2174 units. Due to the extensive preservation of natural areas, the effective population density is less than 12 people per acre making it a low density suburb. However, the built-up area itself, at 22 people per acre, would classify it as a compact neighbourhood.

Demographics

Infrastructure

Transportation 
Private automobile provides the fastest means of transport as Coquitlam and surrounding areas are amply provided with roads and free parking. The area is served by public transit buses at a minimum frequency of every thirty minutes most of the day. Service increases to every fifteen minutes during peak hours and reduces to once per hour late at night. Travel times on bus to Downtown Port Moody or Coquitlam Town Centre are 15–20 minutes. The West Coast Express commuter rail service to Downtown Vancouver leaves from Coquitlam and Port Moody during weekday peak, and frequent rapid transit on Vancouver's SkyTrain network can be accessed from Lafarge Lake–Douglas station, Lincoln station, and Coquitlam Central station.

Schools 
Elementary schools
Bramblewood Elementary
Panorama Heights Elementary
Pinetree Elementary
Hampton Park Elementary
Middle schools
Summit Middle School

Retail 
Westwood Plateau Village

Recreation & Leisure 
There are many parks in the area such as Bramble Park, Ridge Park, Panorama Park, North Hoy Creek Park, and Hampton Park. There are also two golf courses, Westwood Plateau Golf & Country Club and Westwood Plateau Executive 12-Hole Course.

References

External links 

 Census Tract Reference Maps, by Census Metropolitan Areas or Census Agglomerations

Neighbourhoods in Coquitlam